A handicap race in horse racing is a race in which horses carry different weights, allocated by the handicapper. A better horse will carry a heavier weight, to give it a disadvantage when racing against slower horses.

The skill in betting on a handicap race lies in predicting which horse can overcome its handicap. Although most handicap races are run for older, less valuable horses, this is not true in all cases; some great races are handicaps, such as the Grand National steeplechase in England and the Melbourne Cup in Australia. In the United States over 30 handicap races are classified as Grade I, the top level of the North American grading system.

Handicapping in action
In a horse handicap race (sometimes just called "handicap"), each horse must carry a specified weight called the impost, assigned by the racing secretary or steward based on factors such as past performances, so as to equalize the chances of the competitors. To supplement the combined weight of jockey and saddle, up to the assigned impost, lead weights are carried in saddle pads with pockets, called lead pads.

The weight-for-age scale was introduced by Admiral Rous, a steward of the Jockey Club. In 1855 he was appointed public handicapper. In Britain the horses are assigned weights according to a centralised rating system maintained by the British Horseracing Authority (BHA). Weights may be increased if a horse wins a race between the publication of the weights and the running of the contest.

Predicting the outcome of races

Thoroughbred handicapping (in the USA) is the art of predicting horses who have the greatest chance of winning a race, and profiting from these predictions at the horse races. The Daily Racing Form (DRF), a newspaper-style publication, is an important tool of the handicapper or horseplayer. The DRF details statistical information about each horse entered in a race, including detailed past performance results, lifetime records, amount of money earned, odds for the particular horse in each past race, and myriad other information available for casual or serious study.

The handicapping process can be simple or complex but usually includes the following elements prior to the race:
Study of the Daily Racing Form.
Observing the horses’ body language and behaviour in the paddock and/or post parade.
Watching the tote board for the changing odds of each horse and thus for clues about how the betting public views a horse's chances of winning the upcoming race

“Trip handicapping” takes place during the race and involves watching the horses (usually with binoculars) and noting relevant information about how a horse runs during that race.

Handicapping theory is possibly one of the most enigmatic theories in all of sports.  Horseplayers consider the following elements when handicapping a horse race:

Speed The DRF lists times at certain call points of each race, and the lengths back from the lead at each call point. Speed handicappers compare race times to help ascertain which horses will most likely win the race. The DRF contains a numerical summation of the speed that each horse ran in every race, called a Beyer speed figure. This number is generated through a method developed by Andrew Beyer, and described in his 1975 book Picking Winners. The Beyer speed figures takes into account the individual class of a race as well as how the racetrack was playing on a particular day to create an aggregate number for each horse.

Pace Pace handicappers classify each horse's running style (i.e. front runner, stalker, presser, closer) and then find contenders based on the predicted pace of today's race. The difficulty is that the jockey has control over where a horse is placed in a race and how fast that race goes in the early stages. This takes the prediction of pace for a given race out of the realm of mathematics and into the realm of mere speculation. Until the 1970s, for pace handicapping purposes, the time generally allotted by pace handicappers for a horse to run a length (approximately 11 feet) during the course of a race was long thought to be a fifth of a second. Andrew Beyer was the first to contest this in his 1975 book Picking Winners, stating that the time span of a beaten length (at the end of the race) varied by race distance, as horses would be traveling faster at the end of shorter distanced races than they would at longer ones. Others, particularly devotees of the Sartain Methodology in the 1980s, furthered this principle to include fractional (internal race) times. Today, the value of a beaten length is generally accepted to be closer to 0.16 seconds than to 0.20. The standard of one-fifth of a second is somewhat valid in Standardbred (harness) racing.

Form A "sharp" horse could have finished strongly, stayed among the leaders, finished “in the money” (1st, 2nd or 3rd) or recovered from a bad racing trip. Conversely, a horse showed dull form if it gave up, looked sluggish or chased the pack. Horses with sharp form have the lowest odds and hence return the least money per bet. Also, often horses will race off a "layoff." A layoff is a rest varying in length from usually two months to a year or more. In this case, workouts, horse appearance, and trainer patterns are the best guides to whether the horse is ready to run after a rest.

Class Horse races occur at different levels of competition. Generally, high caliber horses are entered in races with other high caliber horses and slower horses are entered in races with other slower horses. But a horse can move up or down in class, depending on where the trainer decided to enter the horse based on the results of its last race. Note that the strength of the same class of race, such as a Maiden Special Weight race, will vary greatly from track to track, as well as from race to race at the same track, making this too an inexact determinant of class.

Post-position or draw The horse nearer the inside of a race track will have a shorter distance to run than a horse on the outside track, although it is also more vulnerable to being cut off by horses that start off faster and head to the inside rail.

Jockey A better jockey can make a difference between a winning horse and one that loses.

Other factors Other factors affecting the outcome of a race are track condition, weather, weight that the horses have to carry, daily bias of the racing surface, and many more factors that the handicapper cannot know. The track condition is closely linked to the weather as rain/snow and the amount of sun affect the firmness of the turf or the condition of the dirt. A wet track is usually denoted as "sloppy". There are cases however when a roller is run over a wet track (if the rain has stopped) and such a track is denoted "sealed". It is difficult to measure some factors with data.

See also
Graded stakes race
Thoroughbred horse racing
Weight for Age
Allowance race
Sports betting
Walter Vosburgh

References

Harness racing
Horse racing terminology
Handicapping